The 1983 Trans America Athletic Conference men's basketball tournament (now known as the ASUN men's basketball tournament) was held March 10–12, 1983 at Barton Coliseum in Little Rock, Arkansas.

Georgia Southern upset top-seeded  in the championship game, 68–67, to win their first TAAC/Atlantic Sun men's basketball tournament. The Eagles, in turn, received an automatic bid to the 1983 NCAA tournament, their first Division I tournament appearance. 

Northeast Louisiana departed the TAAC for the Southland Conference prior to the season and were replaced with Nicholls State.

Bracket

References

ASUN men's basketball tournament
Tournament
TAAC men's basketball tournament
TAAC men's basketball tournament